Le Blanc is an unincorporated community in Allen Parish, Louisiana, United States. Le Blanc has a post office with ZIP code 70651, which opened on December 20, 1899.

References

Unincorporated communities in Allen Parish, Louisiana
Unincorporated communities in Louisiana